Arkady Vladimirovich Dvorkovich (born 26 March 1972) is a Russian politician and economist, who was Deputy Prime Minister in Dmitry Medvedev's Cabinet from 21 May 2012 until 7 May 2018. He was previously an Assistant to the President of the Russian Federation from May 2008 to May 2012.

Dvorkovich was considered to be a close confidant of Dmitry Medvedev and an important figure in Russian politics. He rose to prominence during Medvedev's presidency but has suffered from the resurgence of Igor Sechin. From 2018 to 2022 he was the Chairman of Skolkovo Foundation. Since 2015, he is also the Chairman of the Board of the Directors in Russian Railways company. 

Dvorkovich's father, Vladimir Dvorkovich, was an international chess arbiter. Dvorkovich is an official of the Russian Chess Federation and was first elected president of FIDE (the International Chess Federation) in October 2018, succeeding Kirsan Ilyumzhinov, and was re-elected for a second term in the elections held on the sidelines of the 44th Chess Olympiad held at Mamallapuram, India on August 7, 2022.

Education
Moscow State University, Faculty of Economics (1994)
New Economic School (1994)
Duke University (1997)

Career

Since 1994 – consultant, senior expert, CEO, scientific director of the Economic Expert Group of the Ministry of Finance of Russia
Since 2000 – expert in the "Center for Strategic Research"
Since August 2000 – adviser to the Minister for Economic Development of the Russian Federation German Gref
Since 2001 – Deputy Minister for Economic Development of the Russian Federation
Since April 2004 – Head of Expert Group of President of the Russian Federation
Since 13 May 2008 – Assistant to the President of the Russian Federation
21 May 2012 to 7 May 2018 – Deputy Prime Minister of Russia

In 2018, he served as chairman of the 2018 FIFA World Cup Russia Local Organizing Committee, collaborating closely with FIFA President Gianni Infantino, who later praised him for his work. Subsequently, on 3 October 2018, he was elected FIDE President, receiving 103 votes, ahead of 78 votes for FIDE Vice President Georgios Markropoulos; noted English GM Nigel Short withdrew his candidacy minutes before voting commenced.

Dvorkovich's professional interests include economic regulation, financial management, and tax planning. According to BusinessWeek, Dvorkovich was included in the list of 50 potential world leaders.

Dvorkovich speaks English and German, as well as Russian.

In March 2022, Dvorkovich condemned Russia's invasion of Ukraine, saying that "Wars are the worst things one might face in life…including this war. My thoughts are with Ukrainian civilians." Andrey Turchak, a lawmaker from Putin's United Russia party, condemned Dvorkovich's anti-war stance and called for his “immediate dismissal in disgrace”, saying: "This is nothing but the very national betrayal, the behavior of the fifth column, which the president [Putin] spoke about today”. Later Dvorkovich said on the website of the Skolkovo foundation that he was "sincerely proud of the courage of our (Russian) soldiers" and that Russia had been targeted by "harsh and senseless sanctions".

In August 2022, he was re-elected for a second term as FIDE president receiving 157 votes as against 16 by his rival Andrey Baryshpolets.

Honours and awards
Order of Merit for the Fatherland 4th class
Order of Honour
Medal 2nd class of the Order of Merit for the Fatherland
Medal "In Commemoration of the 1000th Anniversary of Kazan"
Officer of the Order of Merit of the Italian Republic

References

External links

Official Facebook profile

Medvedev's Star Adviser (WSJ)
  Дворкович, Аркадий Владимирович

1972 births
Living people
1st class Active State Councillors of the Russian Federation
21st-century Russian economists
Moscow State University alumni
New Economic School alumni
Chess officials
Medvedev Administration personnel
Presidents of FIDE